Gormiti Nature Unleashed is an Italian CGI animated series co-produced from Giochi Preziosi and Mondo TV, based on the Gormiti toy line series. It is unrelated with the first Gormiti TV series.

After the first Gormiti series success among Italy and Europe, production companies decided to revive it in a combination of 3D and computer-generated animation in high definition. According to Michelle Azoury, head of sales and brand manager at Mondo TV, it "does not discount the earlier series but does not directly address it either."

It is broadcast in over 130 countries worldwide.

Plot
Three thousand years ago, the Island of Gorm faced its gravest hour - Magor, the Volcano tribe's dreaded leader, was at the zenith of his power. His dark rage and volcanic powers threatened to consume the entire island along with every living Gormiti! Magor was repelled only through the selfless combat and incredible power of the Invincible Lords of Nature. Called from the other four tribes - Earth, Air, Sea, and Forest - they were guided by their mysterious benefactor, the Old Sage.

The Lords knew that a victory against Magor was temporary if the source of their newfound power remained intact. The wisest among the original Lords devised a brilliant, but drastic plan - divide the source of all their power - The Heart of Gorm - into four Gorm Stones, and hide each piece deep within their respective kingdoms. To ensure that these Gorm Stones remained forever apart, the Lords made a difficult but necessary decision that changed their island nations forever. They constructed massive, impenetrable walls separating their formerly unified kingdoms for all time. To further ensure Magor was lost to time, each Lord allowed Old Sage to remove their memories of the Gorm Stone locations from their minds.

It was an enormous price to pay. The Gormiti had forged a wonderful society by living and working together. However, if peace was to prosper, there was no other way. Or so they thought. Each of the Elemental Lords of Gorm retreated to his kingdom, sealing it off from his allies forever. The legends of this epic battle and the willpower it took to complete it lived on through generations in the form of a story known as The Way. The story is a roadmap that details the legendary Lords' plans for hard fought peace and provides hope for future generations to continue The Way.

And for over three thousand years the peace has lasted...Until today...

The day young Agrom, prince of the Earth Tribe, found a crack in his kingdom's wall...

List of episodes

Pilot
The Air up There
Raging Waters 
Deep Roots
The Fifth Stone
Gerz So Good
Rivers of Fire
Burning Heart 
The Sky Is Falling
Riptide
Power Play
Brotherhood
The Fire Doors of Perception
Fire Brand
The Portal of Fire
The Pisces War
Fire in the Sky
If a Tree Falls
The Stone And The Glass
The Sacrifice
The Face In The Sand
The Beast Of Eagle's Peak
A Shadow of Hope
Everything in its Place
All for One
To All Things... an Ending

Broadcast

References

External links
Nick | Gormiti | Play games, get downloads and watch clips | Nickelodeon - Nick UK's official Gormiti website, launched October 2, 2009.
Il Mondo del Bambino | www.giochipreziosi.it Official corporate site of Giochi Preziosi, creators of Gormiti.

2000s toys
Keshi
Man of Action Studios
Italian computer-animated television series
Italian children's animated fantasy television series
Italian children's animated action television series
Italian children's animated adventure television series
Cartoon Network original programming